is the railway station in Isahaya, Nagasaki Prefecture, Japan. It is operated by JR Kyushu and is on the Nagasaki Main Line.

Lines
Only local trains run on this branch.

Station layout 
The station consists of two side platforms serving two tracks with a siding branching off track 1. The station building is a v-shaped modern timber structure which is unstaffed and houses a waiting room with a SUGOCA farecard reader. Access to the opposite side platform is by means of a footbridge.

Adjacent stations

History
On 27 November 1898, a link up was made between Nagayo and the track from Tosu which had expanded south to Ōmura. Okusa was opened on the same day as an intermediate station on the new stretch of track. When the Kyushu Railway was nationalized on 1 July 1907, Japanese Government Railways (JGR) took over control of the station. On 12 October 1909, the track from Tosu through Haiki, Ōmura, Nagayo to Nagasaki was designated the Nagasaki Main Line. On 2 October 1972, a shorter inland bypass route was opened between  through  to Urakami was opened, which became known as the new line or Ichinuno branch of the Nagasaki Main Line. The section serving Okusa became known as the old line or the Nagayo branch. With the privatization of Japanese National Railways (JNR), the successor of JGR, on 1 April 1987, control of the station passed to JR Kyushu.

Passenger statistics
In fiscal 2014, there were a total of 50,679 boarding passengers, giving a daily average of 139 passengers.

Environs
Route 207
Ōmura Bay

See also
 List of railway stations in Japan

References

External links
Okusa Station (JR Kyushu)

Railway stations in Nagasaki Prefecture
Nagasaki Main Line
Railway stations in Japan opened in 1898